Newark High School may refer to:

 Newark High School (Delaware), Newark, Delaware

 Newark High School (Ohio), Newark, Ohio
 Newark Catholic High School, Newark, Ohio

 Newark Memorial High School, Newark, California

 Barringer High School, Newark, New Jersey (The name was changed from Newark High School in 1907.)

See also
 Newark Academy (disambiguation)
 Newark (disambiguation)